The chestnut-banded plover (Charadrius pallidus) is a species of bird in the family Charadriidae. This species has a large range, being distributed across Southern Africa. However, it occupies a rather small area.

Identification
It grows about 15 cm tall and has proportionally long dark legs, black lores and eye-stripes leading to a black bill. The forehead, throat and belly are white, while a chestnut breast-band joins a band of same colour on the fore-crown. Back and crown are greyish brown.

Behaviour
Although this species' movements vary throughout its range and are therefore poorly understood it is thought to be a partial migrant.

General Behaviour

The number of chestnut-banded plovers varies from year to year at any given site. Especially in response to droughts at inland breeding sites will the population fluctuate, reflecting even on the size of the global population. Breeding mostly coincides with rains.
This bird can usually be found in pairs of small groups. Pairs defend territories particularly during the breeding season. During the non-breeding season, it forms very large communities. At one point, 375 birds were seen together in Namibia.<ref>Hockey et al.''' 2005</ref> It is known to sometimes forage in loose flocks of up to 60 birds and will occasionally roost with other plover species.

South Africa

Coastal Birds in South Africa appear to be mostly resident. They breed between March and May as well as from September to January.

Habitat

This species is mostly associated with alkaline and saline water.

DistributionCharadrius pallidus has two separate populations. The nominate subspecies is found in Angola, Botswana, Kenya, Mozambique, Namibia, South Africa, Tanzania, Zambia and Zimbabwe. The subspecies venustus'' can only be found in the Rift Valley in Kenya and Tanzania. There is strong genetic divergence between these two subspecies based on microsatellite genotyping and mitochondrial sequence analyses.

However, because it occurs at fewer than ten locations in the non-breeding season, and habitat quality thereof is declining, the chestnut-banded plover is evaluated as Near Threatened in the 2007 IUCN Red List.

Population

The global population is estimated to be around 17,500 individuals. During non-breeding season, Walvis Bay and Sandwich Harbour in Namibia and Lake Natron in Tanzania can hold 87% of the world population.

Breeding Habitat

This species breeds in alkaline and saline wetlands, including inland salt pans. It will even make use of man-made salt ponds. At the coast, it is found around lagoons and salt marshes. Preferring areas devoid of vegetation, it is hardly found more than 50m from the water's edge.
The nest is a round scrape in calcareous soil, dry mud or stony ground. It usually has a diameter of 5 cm and is 1 cm deep.

Non-breeding Habitat

During non-breeding season, the chestnut-banded plover is increasingly found in its coastal habitat. It now occurs up to 1 km away from the water.

Diet
The exact diet is unknown but believed to consist of insect larvae and small crustaceans.

Habitual Threats
Two key sites face ongoing threats by the human population.

Walvis Bay

Walvis Bay on Namibia's central coast, premier site for this species, faces pollution by Namibia's largest port and siltation by a salt works at the southern end of the lagoon. Pollution by the port includes concentrations of fish oils and other detritus from ships.

Lake Natron

Despite its unwelcoming climate and inaccessibility, Lake Natron in Tanzania may suffer reduced water input in future, reducing the chestnut-banded plover's habitat greatly.
An irrigation project on the Ewaso-Ng'iro River and a soda-extraction plant along the lake's south-western shores threaten to use much of the water that would otherwise flow into the lake.

Conservation
The three most important habitat sites are designated Ramsar sites and Important Bird Areas. Sandwich Harbour is additionally a National Park while Lake Natron is a game controlled area.

References

BirdLife International (2007a): [ 2006-2007 Red List status changes ]. Retrieved 2007-AUG-26.
BirdLife International (2007b): Chestnut-banded Plover - BirdLife Species Factsheet. Retrieved 2007-AUG-26.

External links
 Chestnut-banded plover - Species text in The Atlas of Southern African Birds.

chestnut-banded plover
Birds of Southern Africa
Fauna of Kenya
Fauna of Tanzania
chestnut-banded plover
Taxonomy articles created by Polbot
Taxa named by Hugh Edwin Strickland